The 1954 World Chess Championship was played between Mikhail Botvinnik and Vasily Smyslov in Moscow from March 16 to May 13, 1954. Botvinnik had been World Champion since 1948 and had successfully defended the title in 1951, while Smyslov earned the right to challenge by winning the 1953 Candidates tournament.

The match was drawn 12–12, meaning Botvinnik retained the world title.

1952 Interzonal tournament

An interzonal tournament was held at Saltsjöbaden in Stockholm, Sweden, in September and October 1952. The top eight finishers qualified for the Candidates tournament.

{| class="wikitable"
|+ 1952 Interzonal Tournament
|-
!  !! !! 1 !! 2 !! 3 !! 4 !! 5 !! 6 !! 7 !! 8 !! 9 !! 10 !! 11 !! 12 !! 13 !! 14 !! 15 !! 16 !! 17 !! 18 !! 19 !! 20 !! 21 !! Total !! Tie break
|- style="background:#ccffcc;"
| 1 || align=left| || x || ½ || ½ || ½ || ½ || ½ || 1 || 1 || 1 || 1 || 1 || ½ || ½ || 1 || 1 || 1 || 1 || 1 || 1 || 1 || 1 || 16½ ||
|- style="background:#ccffcc;"
| 2 || align=left| || ½ || x || ½ || ½ || ½ || ½ || ½ || ½ || 1 || ½ || ½ || ½ || 1 || 1 || 1 || ½ || 1 || ½ || ½ || 1 || 1 || 13½ || 125.50
|- style="background:#ccffcc;"
| 3 || align=left| || ½ || ½ || x || ½ || ½ || ½ || 1 || ½ || ½ || ½ || ½ || 1 || ½ || ½ || 1 || 1 || ½ || 1 || 1 || 1 || ½ || 13½ || 125.00
|- style="background:#ccffcc;"
| 4 || align=left| || ½ || ½ || ½ || x || ½ || 1 || 0 || 0 || 1 || ½ || 1 || ½ || ½ || ½ || 1 || ½ || 1 || 1 || 1 || 1 || ½ || 13 ||
|- style="background:#ccffcc;"
| 5 || align=left| || ½ || ½ || ½ || ½ || x || 0 || ½ || 1 || ½ || ½ || ½ || ½ || 1 || ½ || ½ || 1 || ½ || 1 || 1 || 1 || ½ || 12½ || 115.25
|- style="background:#ccffcc;"
| 6 || align=left| ||½ ||½ ||½ ||0 ||1 ||x ||0 ||1 ||½ ||½ ||½ ||½ ||½ ||1 ||1 ||1 ||0 ||1 ||1 ||½ ||1 || 12½ || 115.00
|- style="background:#ccffcc;"
| 7 || align=left| ||0 ||½ ||0 ||1 ||½ ||1 ||x ||½ ||½ ||1 ||½ ||½ ||½ ||½ ||1 ||1 ||½ ||½ ||1 ||½ ||1 ||12½ || 114.25
|- style="background:#ccffcc;"
| 8 || align=left| || 0 || ½ || ½ || 1 || 0 || 0 || ½ || x || 0 || ½ || ½ || ½ || 1 || 1 || ½ || 1 || 1 || 1 || 1 || 1 || 1 || 12½ || 105.50
|-
| 9 || align=left| ||0 ||0 ||½ ||0 ||½ ||½ ||½ ||1 ||x ||½ ||0 ||½ ||1 ||½ ||½ ||½ ||½ ||½ ||1 ||½ ||½ ||11½ || 
|-
| 10 || align=left| ||0 ||½ ||½ ||½ ||½ ||½ ||0 ||½ ||½ ||x ||½ ||1 ||0 ||½ ||0 ||½ ||1 ||½ ||1 ||1 ||1 ||10½ || 
|-
| 11 || align=left| ||0 ||½ ||½ ||0 ||½ ||½ ||½ ||½ ||1 ||½ ||x ||1 ||0 ||½ ||½ ||½ ||1 ||0 ||½ ||½ ||1 ||10 || 93.75
|-
| 12 || align=left| ||½ ||½ ||0 ||½ ||½ ||½ ||½ ||½ ||½ ||0 ||0 ||x ||½ ||½ ||1 ||½ ||½ ||1 ||1 ||½ ||½ ||10 ||92.50
|-
| 13 || align=left| ||½ ||0 ||½ ||½ ||0 ||½ ||½ ||0 ||0 ||1 ||1 ||½ ||x ||½ ||0 ||0 ||1 ||1 ||½ ||1 ||1 ||10 || 88.50
|-
| 14 || align=left| ||0 ||0 ||½ ||½ ||½ ||0 ||½ ||0 ||½ ||½ ||½ ||½ ||½ ||x ||0 ||½ ||1 ||½ ||1 ||½ ||1 ||9 || 
|-
| 15 || align=left| ||0 ||0 ||0 ||0 ||½ ||0 ||0 ||½ ||½ ||1 ||½ ||0 ||1 ||1 ||x ||1 ||½ ||0 ||0 ||1 ||½ ||8 || 
|-
| 16 || align=left| ||0 ||½ ||0 ||½ ||0 ||0 ||0 ||0 ||0 ||½ ||½ ||½ ||1 ||½ ||0 ||x ||0 ||1 ||1 ||½ ||1 ||7½ ||
|-
| 17 || align=left| ||0 ||0 ||½ ||0 ||½ ||1 ||½ ||0 ||0 ||0 ||0 ||½ ||0 ||0 ||½ ||1 ||x ||½ ||0 ||1 ||1 ||7 || 
|-
| 18 || align=left| ||0 ||½ ||0 ||0 ||0 ||0 ||½ ||0 ||0 ||½ ||1 ||0 ||0 ||½ ||1 ||0 ||½ ||x ||½ ||0 ||1 ||6 || 
|-
| 19 || align=left| ||0 ||½ ||0 ||0 ||0 ||0 ||0 ||0 ||½ ||0 ||½ ||0 ||½ ||0 ||1 ||0 ||1 ||½ ||x ||½ ||0 || 5 || 
|-
| 20 || align=left| ||0 ||0 ||0 ||0 ||0 ||½ ||½ ||0 ||0 ||0 ||½ ||½ ||0 ||½ ||0 ||½ ||0 ||1 ||½ ||x ||0 ||4½ || 39.25
|-
| 21 || align=left| ||0 ||0 ||½ ||½ ||½ ||0 ||0 ||0 ||0 ||0 ||0 ||½ ||0 ||0 ||½ ||0 ||0 ||0 ||1 ||1 ||x ||4½ || 38.00
|}

Only the top five were supposed to have qualified for a 12-player Candidates Tournament, but four players were tied for fifth place, and since the Sonneborn-Berger tie-break margins were so small, all four were included.
The tournament was surrounded by some controversy as the five Soviet players took the top five spots – having drawn every single game amongst themselves, several of them after suspiciously few moves.
Originally, the 1952 Interzonal was supposed to have featured 22 players, but Julio Bolbochán of Argentina suffered a hemorrhage and had to withdraw after a first-round adjournment.

1953 Candidates tournament

The Candidates tournament was held in Zürich, Switzerland, from August to October 1953, with the winner qualifying for the championship match against Botvinnik.

The field consisted of 15 players: The top eight from the 1952 Interzonal, the top five from the previous Candidates Tournament (Bronstein, Boleslavsky, Smyslov, Keres, and Najdorf), and the last two players from the 1948 championships not already qualified (Reshevsky and Euwe).

After 22 rounds, Smyslov and Reshevsky were tied for the lead on 13.5 points out of 21, followed by Bronstein on 12.5 and Keres on 12. Smyslov took a decisive lead in the next few rounds:
 In round 23, Kotov defeated Reshevsky while Smyslov had the bye. Bronstein and Keres moved up to 13 points. 
 In round 24, Smyslov defeated Keres with black, while Reshevsky drew with Geller and Bronstein also drew.
 In round 25, Smyslov defeated Reshevsky, while Bronstein lost to Geller and Keres had the bye.
So in those three rounds, Smyslov scored 2/2 while Reshevsky scored ½/3. After round 25 the leaders were: Smyslov 15.5 with a game in hand, Reshevsky 14, Bronstein 13.5, Keres 13 with a game in hand. Smyslov drew his five remaining games, beginning with Bronstein in round 26.

Smyslov qualified as challenger by winning the tournament.

{|class="wikitable" style="text-align: center"
! # !! Player !! 1 !! 2 !! 3 !! 4 !! 5 !! 6 !! 7 !! 8 !! 9 !! 10 !! 11 !! 12 !! 13 !! 14 !! 15 !! Total 
|- style="background:#ccffcc;"
| 1 || align=left |  ||xx ||½½ ||11 ||½1 ||½½ ||11 ||½½ ||½0 ||½½||½½||½½||½½||1½||11||1½|| 18  
|-
| 2-4|| align=left |  ||½½ ||xx ||1½ ||11 ||½½ ||½0 ||½½ ||½½ ||1½||½½||½½||01||1½||½½||½½|| 16 
|-
| 2-4 || align=left |  ||00||0½||xx ||½½ ||½1 ||½1 ||½½ ||½½ ||½½||0½||11||1½||½1||½½||11|| 16
|-
| 2-4 || align=left |   ||½0 ||00 ||½½ ||xx ||½½ ||½½ ||½½ ||10||½½||½1||½1||1½||½1||11||1½|| 16 
|-
| 5 || align=left |  ||½½ ||½½ ||½0 ||½½ ||xx ||½½ ||0½ ||½½ ||00||½½||½½||11||½1||1½||11|| 15 
|-
| 6-7 || align=left |  ||00||½1||½0||½½ ||½½||xx ||11||½0||01||½½||01||1½||½1||01||½½|| 14½ 
|-      
| 6-7 || align=left |   ||½½||½½||½½||½½||1½||00||xx ||1½||1½||½0||½½||½½||½½||0½||11||14½ 
|-      
| 8-9|| align=left |  ||½1||½½||½½||01||½½||½1||0½||xx ||10||1½||00||10||1½||0½||01|| 14 
|-      
| 8-9 || align=left |  ||½½||0½||½½||½½||11||10||0½||01||xx ||10||½½||½½||½0||0½||11|| 14 
|-     
| 10-11 || align=left |   ||½½||½½||1½||0½||½½||½½||1½||0½||01 ||xx ||½½ ||½½ ||0½ ||11 ||00|| 13½ 
|-     
| 10-11 || align=left |   ||½½||½½||00||½0||½½||10||½½||11||½½ ||½½ ||xx ||½0 ||½½ ||½1 ||½½|| 13½
|-     
| 12 || align=left |   ||½½||10||0½||0½||00||0½||½½||01||½½ ||½½ ||½1 ||xx ||1½ ||½½ ||1½ || 13 
|-     
| 13 || align=left |   ||0½||0½||½0||½0||½0||½0||½½||0½||½1 ||1½ ||½½ ||0½ ||xx ||½1 ||11 || 12½
|-     
| 14 || align=left |   ||00||½½||½½||00||0½||10||1½||1½||1½ ||00 ||½0 ||½½ ||½0 ||xx ||1½ || 11½ 
|-     
| 15 || align=left |   ||0½||½½||00||0½||00||½½||00||10 ||00||11 ||½½ ||0½ ||00 ||0½ ||xx || 8 
|}

Allegations of Soviet collusion

There have been allegations of Soviet collusion in the Candidates tournament. Most sensationally, writing in the early 2000s, David Bronstein alleged that certain players were pressured to ensure Smyslov would win ahead of Reshevsky. He alleged that Keres was pressured to make a quick draw with white in his round 24 game against Smyslov, but that Keres resisted this, but the pressure made him in no fit state to play (and he lost). He also alleged that he (Bronstein) was pressured to make a draw with white against Smyslov in round 26, and he complied by playing the unaggressive Ruy Lopez exchange variation.

Soon after the article emerged, Smyslov replied, criticising the allegations, though Andy Soltis read that as meaning he didn't deny them. Yuri Averbakh said that Bronstein "cannot be 100% objective" on his world championship attempts.

Books
The tournament is famous for the strength of the players, the high quality of the games, and books on the tournament by participants David Bronstein and Miguel Najdorf that are regarded as among the best tournament books ever written.

1954 Championship match

Conditions
The match was played as best of 24 games. If it ended 12-12, Botvinnik, the holder, would retain the Championship.

Match

Botvinnik retained the Championship.

References

1954
1954 in chess
1954 in Soviet sport
1954 in Moscow